Peter Zumthor (born 26 April 1943) is a Swiss architect whose work is frequently described as uncompromising and minimalist. Though managing a relatively small firm, he is the winner of the 2009 Pritzker Prize and 2013 RIBA Royal Gold Medal.

Early life
Zumthor was born in Basel, Switzerland. His father was a cabinet-maker, which exposed him to design from an early age and led him to become an apprentice for a carpenter later in 1958. He studied at the Kunstgewerbeschule (arts and crafts school) in his native city starting in 1963.

In 1966, Zumthor studied industrial design and architecture as an exchange student at Pratt Institute in New York. In 1968, he became conservationist architect for the Department for the Preservation of Monuments of the canton of Graubünden. This work on historic restoration projects gave him a further understanding of construction and the qualities of different rustic building materials. As his practice developed, Zumthor was able to incorporate his knowledge of materials into Modernist construction and detailing. His buildings explore the tactile and sensory qualities of spaces and materials while retaining a minimalist feel.

Career

Zumthor founded his own firm in 1979. His practice grew quickly and he accepted more international projects.

Zumthor has taught at University of Southern California Institute of Architecture and SCI-ARC in Los Angeles (1988), the Technical University of Munich (1989), Tulane University (1992), and the Harvard Graduate School of Design (1999). Since 1996, he has been a professor at the Accademia di Architettura di Mendrisio.

His best known projects are the Kunsthaus Bregenz (1997), a shimmering glass and concrete cube that overlooks Lake Constance (Bodensee) in Austria; the cave-like thermal baths in Vals, Switzerland (1999); the Swiss Pavilion for Expo 2000 in Hannover, an all-timber structure intended to be recycled after the event; the Kolumba Diocesan Museum (2007), in Cologne; and the Bruder Klaus Field Chapel, on a farm near Wachendorf.

In 1993, Zumthor won the competition for a museum and documentation center on the horrors of Nazism to be built on the site of Gestapo headquarters in Berlin. Zumthor's submission called for an extended three-story building with a framework consisting of concrete rods. The project, called the Topography of Terror, was partly built and then abandoned when the government decided not to go ahead for financial reasons. The unfinished building was demolished in 2004. 

In 1999, Zumthor was selected as the only foreign architect to participate in Norway's National Tourist Routes Project, with two projects, the Memorial in Memory of the Victims of the Witch Trials in Varanger, a collaboration with Louise Bourgeois (completed in 2010), and a rest area/museum on the site of an abandoned zinc mine.

For the Dia Art Foundation in Beacon, New York, Zumthor designed a gallery that was to house the 360° I Ching sculpture by Walter de Maria; though the project was never completed. Zumthor is the only foreign architect to participate, with two projects, the Memorial in Memory of the Victims of the Witch Trials in Varanger, a collaboration with Louise Bourgeois (2011), and a rest area/museum on the site of the abandoned Allmannajuvet zinc mines, in operation from 1882 to 1898, in Norway (2016). In November 2009, it was revealed that Zumthor is working on a major redesign for the campus of the Los Angeles County Museum of Art. Recently, he turned down an opportunity to consider a new library for Magdalen College, Oxford. He was selected to design the Serpentine Gallery's annual summer pavilion with designer Piet Oudolf in 2011.

Currently, Zumthor works out of his small studio with around 30 employees, in Haldenstein, near the city of Chur, in Switzerland.

Recognition

In 1994, he was elected to the Academy of Arts, Berlin.  In 1996, he was made an honorary member of the Bund Deutscher Architekten (BDA). In 1998, Zumthor received the Carlsberg Architectural Prize for his designs of the Kunsthaus Bregenz in Bregenz, Austria and the Thermal Baths at Vals, Switzerland (see below). He won the Mies van der Rohe Award for European Architecture in 1999. Recently, he was awarded Praemium Imperiale in (2008) and the Pritzker Architecture Prize (2009). In 2012, he was awarded the RIBA Royal Gold Medal.

Literature

Zumthor's work is largely unpublished in part because of his philosophical belief that architecture must be experienced first hand. His published written work is mostly narrative and phenomenological.

Thinking Architecture

In Thinking Architecture Peter Zumthor expresses his motivation in designing buildings that have an emotional connection and possess a powerful and unmistakable presence and personality. It is illustrated throughout with color photographs by Laura J. Padgett of Zumthor's new home and studio in Haldenstein.

To me, buildings can have a beautiful silence that I associate with attributes such as composure, self-evidence, durability, presence, and integrity, and with warmth and sensuousness as well; a building that is being itself, being a building, not representing anything, just being. The sense that I try to instil into materials is beyond all rules of composition, and their tangibility, smell, and acoustic qualities are merely elements of the language we are obliged to use. Sense emerges when I succeed in bringing out the specific meanings of certain materials in my buildings, meanings that can only be perceived in just this way in this one building. When I concentrate on a specific site or place for which I am going to design a building, when I try to plumb its depths, its form, its history, and its sensuous qualities, images of other places start to invade this process of precise observation: images of places I know and that once impressed me, images of ordinary or special places places that I carry with me as inner visions of specific moods and qualities; images of architectural situations, which emanate from the world of art, or films, theater or literature.

Atmospheres

Atmospheres is a poetics of architecture and a window into Zumthor's personal sources of inspiration. In nine short, illustrated chapters framed as a process of self-observation, Zumthor describes what he has on his mind as he sets about creating the atmosphere of his houses: images of spaces and buildings that affect him are every bit as important as particular pieces of music or books that inspire him.

From the composition and "presence" of the materials to the handling of proportions and the effect of light, this poetics of architecture enables the reader to recapitulate what really matters in the process of house design. In conclusion, Peter Zumthor has described what really constitutes an architectural atmosphere as "this singular density and mood, this feeling of presence, well-being, harmony, beauty...under whose spell I experience what I otherwise would not experience in precisely this way."

Peter Zumthor Therme Vals

Therme Vals is the only book-length study of this singular building. It features the architect's original sketches and plans for its design as well as Hélène Binet’s striking photographs of the structure. Architectural scholar Sigrid Hauser contributes essays on such topics as "Artemis/Diana," "Baptism," "Mikvah," and "Spring"—drawing out the connections between the elemental nature of the spa and mythology, bathing, and purity.

Annotations by Peter Zumthor on his design concept and the building process elucidate the structure's symbiotic relationship to its natural surroundings, revealing, for example, why he insisted on using locally quarried stone. Therme Vals's scenic design elements, and Zumthor's contributions to this book, reflect the architect's commitment to the essential and his disdain for needless architectural flourishes.

Seeing Zumthor
Seeing Zumthor represents a unique collaboration between Zumthor and Swiss photographer Hans Danuser, containing Danuser's images of buildings created by Zumthor. More than twenty years ago, in a milestone event of twentieth-century architectural photography, Danuser photographed, at Zumthor's invitation, two buildings: the protective structure built for archaeological excavations in Chur and St Benedict's Chapel in Sumvitg. When first shown in exhibition, those photos ignited a lively debate that has been revived with a recent exhibition of Danuser's photographs of Zumthor's most famous work, the spa at Therme Vals. Seeing Zumthor collects these three important series of Danuser's pictures and includes essays by leading art historians exploring the relationship between the two seemingly different disciplines or architecture and photography.

Dear to Me 
In summer 2017, Peter Zumthor curated the exhibition Dear to Me at the Kunsthaus Bregenz, marking the twentieth anniversary of one of his most famous designs. Part of the program were conversations with philosophers, curators, historians, composers, writers, photographers, collectors, and craftsmen that Zumthor had invited to contribute to the exhibition. His dialogues with them offer insights into the thoughts and practice of fascinating personalities. Together with his counterparts, he explores artistic preferences and practices, reasonings, as well as practical knowledge from artisanal experience. In Dear to Me, Zumthor's equally serious and serene conversations with Anita Albus, Aleida Assmann, Marcel Beyer, Hélène Binet, Hannes Böhringer, Renate Breuss, Claudia Comte, Bice Curiger, Esther Kinsky, Ralf Konersmann, Walter Lietha, Olga Neuwirth, Rebecca Saunders, Karl Schlögel, Martin Seel, Rudolf Walli, and Wim Wenders are collected in seventeen booklets held together in an exquisitely manufactured box.

Personal
Zumthor and his wife, Annalisa Zumthor-Cuorad, have three children.

Principal works
 1983 Elementary school Churwalden, Churwalden, Graubünden, Switzerland.
 1983 House Räth, Haldenstein, Graubünden, Switzerland.
 1986 Shelters for Roman archaeological site, Chur, Graubünden, Switzerland.
 1986 Atelier Zumthor, Haldenstein, Graubünden, Switzerland.
 1989 Saint Benedict Chapel, Sumvitg, Graubünden, Switzerland.
 1990 Art Museum Chur, Graubünden, Switzerland.
 1993 Residential home for the elderly, Masans, Chur, Graubünden, Switzerland.
 1994 Gugalun House, Versam, Graubünden, Switzerland.
 1996 Spittelhof housing, Biel-Benken, Basel, Switzerland.
 1996 Therme Vals, Vals, Graubünden, Switzerland.
 1997 Kunsthaus Bregenz, Bregenz, Vorarlberg, Austria. 
 1997 Topography of Terror, International Exhibition and Documentation Centre, Berlin, Germany, partly built, abandoned, demolished in 2004.
 1997–2000 Swiss Pavilion EXPO 2000, Hannover, Germany.
 1997 Villa in Küsnacht am Zürichsee Küsnacht, Switzerland.
 1997 Lichtforum Zumtobel Staff, Zürich, Switzerland.
 2007 Bruder Klaus Kapelle, Mechernich-Wachendorf, Germany.
 2007 Kolumba – Erzbischöfliches Diözesanmuseum, Cologne, Germany.
 2009 Leiser Ensemble, Leis/Vals, Graubünden, Switzerland
 2011 Steilneset Memorial for the Victims of the Witch Trials, Vardø, Norway
 2011 Serpentine Gallery Pavilion 2011, London, England
 2012 Werkraum Bregenzerwald Hof 800, 6866 Andelsbuch, Austria
 2016 Rest area/museum, Allmannajuvet zinc mines
 2018–24 (under construction) LACMA, Los Angeles, CA.

Awards
1987, 2017: Auszeichnungen für gute Bauten Graubünden, Switzerland.
1989: Heinrich Tessenow medal, Technische Universität Hannover, Germany.
1991: Gulam, European wood-glue prize.
1992: Internationaler Architekturpreis für Neues Bauen in den Alpen, Graubünden, Switzerland.
1993: Best Building 1993 award from Swiss tc's 10vor10, Graubünden, Switzerland.
1994: Auszeichnung guter Bauten im Kanton Graubünden, Switzerland.
1995: International Prize for Stone Architecture, Fiera di Verona, Italy.
1995: Internationaler Architekturpreis für Neues Bauen in den Alpen, Graubünden, Switzerland.
1996: Erich-Schelling-Preis für Architektur, Erich-Schelling-Stiftung, Germany.
1998: European Union Prize for Contemporary Architecture (aka Mies van der Rohe Award) for Kunsthaus Bregenz.
1998: Carlsberg Architectural Prize.
2006: Spirit of Nature Wood Architecture Award.
2006: Thomas Jefferson Foundation Medal in Architecture, University of Virginia.
2008: Praemium Imperiale, Japan Arts Association
2009: Pritzker Prize
2013: RIBA Royal Gold Medal for 2013, announced September 2012, award ceremony February 2013

References

External links

 
 Architect Peter Zumthor photo gallery at Time, 2009
 "Slideshow: The Pritzker Prize Winner," Sarah Williams Goldhagen, The New Republic, 16 April 2009
 Interview with Peter Zumthor Interview by Francesco Garutti Klat magazine, 2011
 Conversation with Peter Zumthor and Toni Hildebrandt
 Serpentine Gallery Pavilion 2011—designed by Peter Zumthor
 Channel.louisiana.dk: "Different Kinds of Silence" (2015 video)—interview of Peter Zumthor by Louisiana Channel
 zumthor.org—presentation of projects
 Park Books Specials—presentation of his latest book

1943 births
20th-century Swiss architects
21st-century Swiss architects
Architecture educators
Harvard Graduate School of Design faculty
Honorary Members of the Royal Academy
Living people
Modernist architects
People associated with the Los Angeles County Museum of Art
People from Basel-Stadt
Pratt Institute alumni
Pritzker Architecture Prize winners
Recipients of the Praemium Imperiale
Recipients of the Royal Gold Medal